Malcolm Hodge (born 28 August 1934) is an Australian cricketer. He played in six first-class matches for South Australia in 1960/61.

See also
 List of South Australian representative cricketers

References

External links
 

1934 births
Living people
Australian cricketers
South Australia cricketers
Cricketers from Adelaide